Brion Baker (born 19 August 1988) in Guyana is a footballer who plays as a midfielder. He currently plays for Alpha Union Georgetown and the Guyana national football team.

Club career
In 2007, he played for American college side Barry Buccaneers. In 2008, he signed for TT Pro League outfit Caledonia AIA where he played for 2 seasons. In 2010, he moved back to his homeland to play for Alpha Union Georgetown.

International career
On 8 July 2008 he made his debut for the Guyana national football team in a friendly match against Trinidad and Tobago national football team.

References 

1988 births
Living people
Guyanese footballers
Guyana international footballers
Association football forwards
TT Pro League players
Morvant Caledonia United players
Expatriate footballers in Trinidad and Tobago
Barry University alumni